The 2010 WAFU Nations Cup was the first edition of the WAFU Nations Cup, an association football tournament organised by the West African Football Union. The tournament was also held in 2002, but that edition was cancelled due to the civil war in the host nation Ivory Coast. The 2010 edition was held in Nigeria and was competed by eight national football team selections using only players from local leagues. The event took place between 9 and 18 April 2010 and was sponsored by ECOWAS.

The matches took place at two stadiums; Gateway International Stadium (Ijebu-Ode) and the MKO Abiola Stadium (Abeokuta).

Group A

Table

Matches

Group B

Table

Matches

Knockout stages

Semi-finals

Third place

Final

References

External links

 CafOnline.com

International association football competitions hosted by Nigeria
Wafu Cup, 2010
WAFU Nations Cup
Wafu
Wafu